Two-Gun Betty is a lost 1918 American comedy Western film directed by Howard C. Hickman and starring Bessie Barriscale. It was produced by Robert Brunton and distributed Pathé Exchange.

Plot 
Betty, a determined young woman, wants to be a cowboy. She discovers if she disguises herself as man, she can work on a ranch. The other cowhands, however, discover her ruse and trick her into embarrassing situations.

Cast
 Bessie Barriscale as Betty Craig
 Lee Shumway as Jack Kennedy (credited as L. C. Shumway)
 Katherine Van Buren as Ethel Roberts (credited as Catherine Van Buren)
 Helen Hawley as Florence Kennedy
 Laura Oakley as Miss Ambrose
 Albert R. Cody as Mushy (credited as Albert Cody)
 Richard Wayne as Irish Dave
 William Ellingford as Billy Yeaman
 C. M. Carlos as Carlos
 George Routh as Miguel Carballo

References

External links

 
 

1918 films
American black-and-white films
Films directed by Howard C. Hickman
Pathé Exchange films
1910s Western (genre) comedy films
Lost American films
Lost Western (genre) comedy films
Films distributed by W. W. Hodkinson Corporation
1918 lost films
1918 comedy films
Silent American Western (genre) comedy films
1910s American films
1910s English-language films